Damián Rodrigo Díaz Montero (born 1 May 1986) is a footballer who plays as an attacking midfielder for Barcelona SC. Born in Argentina, he represents the Ecuador national team.

Club career

Rosario Central
Díaz began his career at hometown Juan XXIII for then joined the Rosario Central youth ranks. However, after having success at the football academy he signed his first professional contract with The Canallas as a 20-year-old, to finally in 2007, being promoted to the first adult team by then coach Carlos Ischia, who saw in him a lot of talent.

On 8 April, Díaz made his league debut with Rosario in a 2–1 away loss against Godoy Cruz, scoring his side's goal in the 91st minute at Mendoza. However, Díaz scored his second consecutive goal in his second professional game during a 3–0 home victory over Nueva Chicago at Gigante de Arroyito, scoring the second goal of his team on 58th minute.

After a successful 2007–08 season completing 4 goals in 25 games, Díaz was transferred to Boca Juniors, following his coach Carlos Ischia footsteps, who also left the club for Buenos Aires-based team.

Boca Juniors
After being appointed Boca, Díaz made his official debut in a 4–0 Copa Sudamericana win over last Copa Libertadores champions LDU Quito on 23 September 2008 as an 83rd minute substitution. At La Bombonera team he won the Torneo Apertura (being that his first professional title), which he failed to play it, because he was under the "shadow" of Juan Román Riquelme as the team's playmaker into Ischia's scheme.

In January 2009, he refused go on loan to Greek side Aris Thessaloniki after being taken off the team by Ischia during December of last year, so that he joined the pre-season and played the Torneo de Verano (an Argentine friendly tournament), where played a well role into the starting lineup and made that Ischia shortly after change his decision. On 1 March, Díaz made his league debut during Clausura's fourth week 3–1 home win over Huracán as a starter, being substituted on 46th minute by Nico Gaitán. However, he began to lose importance with Ischia in the team and didn't have a well season again, playing a total of nine games during the year's first half between the league tournament, Copa Libertadores and friendlies (four, two and three games respectively).

Universidad Católica
On 3 July 2009, Universidad Católica signed Díaz on loan was awarded the number 15 shirt. Díaz arrived as part of Gary Medel's transfer operation to his former club Boca Juniors in a loan barter without purchase option.

2009 season
Díaz made his Chilean Primera División début on 27 July 2009, in a 2–0 win over Deportes La Serena at San Carlos de Apoquindo. He scored his first two goals for the club on 23 August, both in a single match against Cobreloa, in where Católica won 2–0 thanks to the goals of Díaz. One month later, he scored his first hat-trick in his career in Católica's 7-0 victory over Curicó Unido. Díaz also scored in the following week against Audax Italiano, match that was won 4–0 by Católica. In that season, Damián was fully consolidated in the position of playmaker at the scheme of Católica's coach, Marco Antonio Figueroa. He was also paired in attack with Juan José Morales and Milovan Mirosevic. The team reached the final against Colo-Colo, but lost 6–4 on aggregate. Following his debut season in the Chilean Primera División, Díaz emerged as one of the league's finest playmakers.

2010 season
Díaz began the 2010 season in fine form, scoring the first goal in Católica's 4–0 thrashing of Santiago Morning. In that season, he was playing of great form, but had too much lack of scoring. On 27 March, Díaz scored his second goal in the tournament against Santiago Wanderers in a 4–2 win, which ended a run of 239 minutes of football without a goal. On 14 April, Kitu scored his first goal in the Copa Libertadores, in a 2–0 home win over Flamengo. Due to his successful at Chile, the club of his country Colón de Santa Fe showed interest on him and also came up the possibility of return to Boca Juniors, one of the big teams of Argentina and South America. Despite of the possibility of play in Argentina, one of the best leagues in the world, Díaz was consistent and extended his scoring streak against Ñublense in a game that was won by Católica 4–2, and he was named the man of the match.

Finally, during the break of the league (because it was a long tournament of one year and was played the 2010 FIFA World Cup at South Africa) everything seemed be that Diaz would remain at Católica, but then the player reached an agreement with the club that attempted to sign him Colón and left the club.

Colón
On 11 June 2010, Colón de Santa Fe signed him for one year, on loan from Boca Juniors.

Barcelona Sporting Club

2011 season
On 11 June 2011, Díaz signed with the Ecuadorian Barcelona.
His debut came on 23 July 2011 in a 2–2 away draw against Espoli. In just his third match for Barcelona, Díaz scored his first goal for the club, the only winning goal, in a home win against CD Olmedo on 8 August. His next goal came in a 3–0 home win against Imbabura FC. Díaz' 3rd goal for Barcelona was on 25 September, in a 2–1 home win over Deportivo Cuenca. He then scored a double on 16 October, in a thrilling 3–0 away win over Independiente Jose Teran. His final goal of the season came in Ecuador's Super Clasico, in a 2–0 home win over Emelec on 19 November. He finished the league having played 20 matches, scoring 6 goals and assisted 3 more.

2012 season
In 2012 Barcelona signed Díaz to a 4-year contract, when Díaz was being observed by clubs like Cruz Azul and Fluminense . Diaz has helped Barcelona in their road to win Barcelona 14th Ecuadorian Serie A title.
Damian Díaz' first match for the 2012 season was a 3–1 home win over Deportivo Cuenca on 5 February. His first goal of the season came several months later, but was an absolute gem, an over-head goal from a cross nearly 40 yards out, was the second goal in a thrilling 3-0 home win over Tecnico Universitario. On 8 July, Damian Díaz, though in a losing 1–0 match against Deportivo Cuenca, it ultimately led to Barcelona ending up finalists for the 2012 League championship final match.

On 5 August, his next goal-scoring feat would come in a thrilling 2–2 away draw against LDU Quito, where he scored both goals, both similar goals, dribbling by 2–3 defenders to score in the back of the net. His next goal was from 25 yards out, in a 2–1 away win against Emelec. On 19 September, Díaz scored a truly magnificent goal, an over-head goal which turned to be the winning goal in a thrilling 4–3 home Copa Sudamericana 2012 match against Cobreloa. His next goal came in a 4–1 home win over Deportivo Cuenca on 21 October. In a vital Ecuadorian Super Clasico home match held on 4 November, Díaz scored 2 goals in a thrilling 5–0 win over city rivals Emelec.  On 28 November, Díaz became 2012 Serie A champion after SD Quito defeated Emelec 2-0, which helped Barcelona secure their first Ecuadorian league title since 1997, their 14th title in their history.

2013 season
His first match of the season was a 1–1 away draw against Deportivo Quevedo on 26 January. His first goal of the season was on Barcelona's Copa Libertadores 2013 debut, a 2–2 away draw against Nacional of Uruguay, he scored the opening goal from long-range. Next he scored in a historically humiliating defeat to Independiente Jose Teran, scoring the 2–1 lead for Barcelona, then Independiente turn the game around in the final ten minutes, defeating Barcelona 5–2. On 6 March, Díaz scored against the Mexican club Toluca in a Copa Libertadores match, drawing 1–1. On 28 April, Damian scored twice against Ecuadorian giants LDU Quito, in a triumphant 3–0 home win.

Al Wahda

2013 season
He moved to the Abu Dhabi club AlWahda.

International career
Born in Argentina, Díaz was nationalized as an Ecuadorian. On 29 March 2021, aged 34, Díaz debuted with the Ecuador national team in a friendly 2–1 win over Bolivia.

Honours
Boca Juniors
 Torneo de Apertura: 2008

Universidad Católica
 Primera División de Chile): runner-up 2009 Clausura, 2010

Barcelona SC
Serie A: 2012, 2016, 2020

References

External links

  Argentine Primera Statistics
 Football-Lineups player profile
Ficha tecnica en futbolchileno.com

1986 births
Living people
Argentine emigrants to Ecuador
Naturalized citizens of Ecuador
Ecuadorian people of Argentine descent
Sportspeople of Argentine descent
Footballers from Rosario, Santa Fe
Ecuadorian footballers
Argentine footballers
Association football midfielders
Ecuador international footballers
2021 Copa América players
Argentine Primera División players
Chilean Primera División players
UAE Pro League players
Barcelona S.C. footballers
Ecuadorian Serie A players
Rosario Central footballers
Boca Juniors footballers
Club Deportivo Universidad Católica footballers
Club Atlético Colón footballers
Al Wahda FC players
Argentine expatriate footballers
Argentine expatriate sportspeople in Chile
Expatriate footballers in Chile
Argentine expatriate sportspeople in the United Arab Emirates
Expatriate footballers in the United Arab Emirates